The 1949 All-Southwest Conference football team consists of American football players chosen by various organizations for All-Southwest Conference teams for the 1949 college football season.  The selectors for the 1949 season included the Associated Press (AP) and the United Press (UP).  Players selected as first-team players by both the AP and UP are designated in bold.

All Southwest selections

Backs
 Doak Walker, SMU (AP-1, UP-1)
 Adrian Burk, Baylor (AP-1, UP-1)
 Kyle Rote, SMU (AP-1, UP-1)
 Lindy Berry, TCU (AP-1, UP-1)
 Bob Smith, Texas A&M (AP-2, UP-2)
 Paul Campbell, Texas (UP-2)
 Gordon Wyatt, Rice (UP-2)
 Geno Mazzanti, Arkansas (UP-2)
 Randall Clay, Texas (AP-2)
 Bobby Lantrip, Rice (AP-2)
 Leon Campbell, Arkansas (AP-2)

Ends
 James "Froggy" Williams, Rice (AP-1, UP-1)
 J. D. Ison, Baylor (AP-1, UP-1)
 Ben Proctor, Texas (AP-2, UP-2)
 Jack Wolcott, Rice (AP-2)
 Frank Fischel, Arkansas (UP-2)

Tackles
 Ralph Murphy, Rice (AP-1, UP-1)
 Harold Kilman, TCU (AP-1, UP-2)
 Bobby Collier, SMU (AP-2)
 John Lunney, Arkansas (AP-2, UP-2)

Guards
 Don Mouser, Baylor (AP-1, UP-1)
 Bud McFadin, Texas (AP-1, UP-1 [t])
 Dan Wolfe, Texas (UP-1)
 Carl Schwarz, Rice (AP-2)
 Jack Halliday, SMU (AP-2)
 Charles Stone, Baylor (UP-2)

Centers
 Joe Watson, Rice (AP-1, UP-1)
 Bones Weatherly, Rice (AP-2, UP-2 [g])
 Eugene Huebner, Baylor (UP-2)

Key

See also
1949 College Football All-America Team

References

All-Southwest Conference
All-Southwest Conference football teams